Oleg Litvinenko (23 November 1973 – 19 November 2007) was a Kazakh International footballer from Taraz, who played as a forward.

Career

Club
In 1998, Litvinenko was banned from football for one-year, after playing for FC Irtysh Pavlodar in the 1998–99 Asian Club Championship whilst not being eligible.

During Litvinenko's time in the Kazakhstan Premier League, he has scored 147 goals, putting him as the all-time top scorer in the tournament, until Nurbol Zhumaskaliyev beat his record.

International
Litvinenko represented Kazakhstan 28 times between 1996 and 2006, whilst also representing the Kazakhstan U-23 10 times, scoring 9 times, during the 1996 Olympic Games Qualifiers.

Death
Litvinenko died on 18 November 2007, four days short of his 34th birthday. Litvinenko was found hanging from a tree in an abandoned cemetery, the cause of death was ruled as a suicide.

Career statistics

Club

International

Statistics accurate as of 5 November 2015

International goals

Honours

Club
Yelimay
 Kazakhstan Top Division (2): 1995, 1998
 Kazakhstan Cup: 1995
Kairat
 Kazakhstan Cup: 1999–00, 2001

Individual
 2005 GOAL Journal "Best Player of the year"
 Kazakhstan Top scorer: 1994, 1998

References

External links 
 Photos at National Team website
 Profile at National Team website
 

1973 births
2007 deaths
Association football forwards
Soviet footballers
Kazakhstani footballers
Kazakhstani expatriate footballers
Kazakhstan international footballers
Expatriate footballers in Cyprus
FC Kairat players
Ermis Aradippou FC players
FC Taraz players
FC Spartak Semey players
Kazakhstan Premier League players
Cypriot First Division players
Suicides by hanging in Kazakhstan
FC Zhenis Astana players
People from Taraz